The Centennial Hall Convention Center was a former gymnasium and convention center located in downtown Hayward, in the City Center complex with the former Centennial Tower. It closed as a convention center on November 1, 2009, and was demolished shortly afterward.

History 
The city of Hayward opened Centennial Hall as a convention center in honor of the city's 100th birthday. Before that it was the gymnasium for Hayward Union High School. The hall contained  of exhibit space and a capacity of up to 1,500 for events. It had eight additional rooms totaling  and a  patio.

Among noteworthy events that occurred at Centennial Hall was an October 1988 campaign appearance by Michael Dukakis, the Democratic nominee for president.

See also
 List of convention centers in the United States

References

Convention centers in California
Buildings and structures in Hayward, California
Demolished buildings and structures in California
Gyms in the United States
Culture of Hayward, California